Noor Afroz Khuwaja (Sindhi: نور افروز خواجہ, July 5, 1953) is an educationist, writer and critic from Hyderabad, Sindh, Pakistan. She has served as Dean, Faculty of Arts at University of Sindh Jamshoro. She was editor of the International Journal of Arts and Humanity and the Literary Magazine Keenjhar and authored more than seven books in Sindhi language.

Early life and education 
Noor Afroz Khuwaja was born on 5 July 1953 at Tando Wali Muhammad, Hyderabad Sindh. Her father Ahmad Ali Tahirani Khuwaja was a businessman from Dando (Sindhi: ڏندو)Town of District Badin, Sindh. She received primary education from Training College Hyderabad. She got first position in Sindh in Primary School Scholarship examination. She was also position holder in the eighth class Scholarship examination. She passed Matriculation examination from Government Miran School Hyderabad and Intermediate from Zubaida Girls College Hyderabad. She graduated from University of Sindh in 1973 in Sindhi. She did PhD from the same university in 1997 under the supervision of the renowned scholar Allama Ghulam Mustafa Qasmi.

Career 
She began her career as a lecturer in the Sindhi Department of Sindh University in 1973. She became professor of the same department in 1997.  She served as chairman of the department from 2005 to 2013 and then as Dean Faculty of Arts from 2010 to 2013. She also served as the director of Mirza Qaleech Baig Chair. She was member of many academic, literary and social institutes including member board of governors of Sindhi Language Authority, member of advisory committee of the Institute of Sindhology, and member of board of studies of various universities.

Literary contributions 
Dr Noor Afroz has authored mre than 100 research articles and following books:
 Pardehi Akhaniyoon (پرڏيھي آکاڻيون), Collection of Stories
 Aghiya Suta sandan (اگھيا سٽ سندان), Essays on life and poetry of Shah Abdul Latif Bhitai
 Wirhagay khan Poe Sindhi Navel jo Awser (ورھاڱي کان پوءِ سنڌي ناول جي اوسر), PhD Thesis
 Pani Pat Kana (پاڻي پٽ ڪڻا), Essays
 Mushik Khathoori Man (مشڪ کٿوري مڻ), Essays
 Aagam Kayo Achan (آگم ڪيو اچن)
 Shah Latif jay Kalam men Istilah, Pahaka aeen Chawniyoon (شاھ لطيف جي ڪلام ۾ اصطلاح، پھاڪا ۽ چوڻيون)

Awards and honours 
 Sami Literary Award
 Agha Khan Social Award
 Allama Ghulam Mustafa Qasmi Award

References 

1953 births
Pakistani female writers
Pakistani women writers
Sindhi people
Sindhi female writers
Sindhi-language writers
Writers from Sindh
People from Hyderabad, Sindh
Living people